Polish Auxiliary Corps was the name of the Polish military formation in the Austro-Hungarian Army. Formed from the Polish Legions, it was created on 20 September 1916 and existed until 19 February 1918. In the aftermath of the Oath crisis, some members of the corps, mainly the 1st, and 3rd Brigades, were forcibly drafted into the main Austro-Hungarian Army or imprisoned. Those of the 2nd Brigade remained in The Polish Auxiliary Corps and formed the basis for the German Polnische Wehrmacht. This lasted until 16 February 1918, when Jozef Haller and the 2nd Brigade rebelled, due to the unfavorable terms found within the Treaty of Brest-Litovsk, leading to the corps' disbandment. Members of this formation fought in the Battle of Rarańcza and Battle of Kaniów, merging with the Polish II Corps in Russia.

External links

  Polski Korpus Posiłkowy WIEM Encyklopedia

Military units and formations established in 1916
Military units and formations disestablished in 1918
Military history of Poland
Austro-Hungarian Army
Poland in World War I
Military units and formations of Poland in World War I
Military units and formations of Austria-Hungary in World War I